Morningside Records is a Danish independent record label founded in 2001.

Signed artists 
 Figurines
 Oh No Ono
 Trobar de Morte
 Under byen

External links 

 Official website

Danish independent record labels